Admiral Lord Charles Thomas Montagu Douglas Scott,  (20 October 1839 – 21 August 1911) was a Royal Navy officer who served as Commander-in-Chief, Plymouth.

Naval career
Born the fourth son of Walter Montagu Douglas Scott, 5th Duke of Buccleuch, Charles Montagu Douglas Scott was educated at Radley College and joined the Royal Navy in 1853. He saw service in the Black Sea in 1855 during the Crimean War. He also took part in the Battle of Fatshan Creek in 1857 during the Second Opium War and served with the Naval Brigade during the Indian Mutiny of 1857.

He was given command of HMS Narcissus in 1875, HMS Bacchante in 1879 and HMS Agincourt in 1885. In 1887 became he became Captain of Chatham Dockyard and then in 1889 he was made Commander of the Australia Station. His last appointment was as Commander-in-Chief, Plymouth in 1900. He retired in 1904.

He was advanced to a Knight Grand Cross of the Order of the Bath (GCB) in the November 1902 Birthday Honours list, and invested with the insignia by King Edward VII at Buckingham Palace on 18 December 1902.

He lived at Boughton House near Kettering in Northamptonshire.

Family
In 1883 he married Ada Mary Ryan; they went on to have two sons.

References

|-

1839 births
1911 deaths
People educated at Radley College
Royal Navy admirals
Knights Grand Cross of the Order of the Bath
Younger sons of dukes